The Beaufort Symphony Orchestra is an orchestra centered in Beaufort, South Carolina. It was started in 1985 by Peter Dunden, the first conductor. It is currently conducted by Frederick Devyatkin.

References

Symphony orchestras